The 2014–15 Liga I was the ninety-seventh season of Liga I, the top-level football league of Romania. The season began on the 25 July 2014 and ended on 30 May 2015. Steaua București successfully defended their title for a record 26th win.

Teams
The last three teams and the 5th position from the 2013–14 season were initially relegated to their respective 2014–15 Liga II division. Săgeata Năvodari, Poli Timișoara, Corona Brașov were relegated and the 5th-placed Vaslui was relegated due to financial problems after 9 seasons in the top flight.

The first two teams from each of the two divisions of 2013–14 Liga II advanced to Liga I. CSMS Iași promoted as the winners of Seria I.  It is their second season in Liga I. Rapid București, second place in Seria I, made an immediate return to Liga I. Universitatea Craiova is for the first time in Liga I from Seria II, together with Târgu Mureș, who returned after a 2 year absence.

Rapid București was initially not given licence for the 2014–15 Liga I, but on 30 June 2014, the International Court of Arbitration for Sport upheld the appeal of Rapid București and therefore decided that they could promote in Liga I.

Venues

Personnel and kits

Note: Flags indicate national team as has been defined under FIFA eligibility rules. Players and Managers may hold more than one non-FIFA nationality.

Managerial changes

League table

Results

Season statistics

Scoring
 First goal: Kehinde Fatai for Astra Giurgiu against Concordia Chiajna (11th minute, 18:41 EEST) (25 July 2014)
 Most goals scored in a match by a single player: 6 goals
 Steaua's Claudiu Keșerü became the first player in the club's history to score six goals in a match, breaking a club record that stood 20 years which was previous set by Keșerü's current manager Constantin Gâlcă. Keșerü was also the first player since Marian Popa in 1993 to score six goals in a league game – that feat also featured five goals from open play and the sixth goal being a penalty kick.

Top scorers
Updated to matches played on 30 May 2015.

1 Claudiu Keșerü was transferred to Al-Gharafa during the winter transfer window.

Hat-tricks

6 Player scored 6 goals

Clean sheets

2 Mário Felgueiras was transferred to Konyaspor during the winter transfer window.

* Only goalkeepers who played all 90 minutes of a match are taken into consideration.

Discipline
As of 30 May 2015

Player
Most yellow cards: 12
 Madson (Universitatea Craiova)
Most red cards: 3
 Pablo Brandán (Universitatea Craiova)
 Ousmane N'Doye (Târgu Mureș)

Club
Most yellow cards: 100
CFR Cluj
Most red cards: 14
Oțelul Galați

Champion squad

Monthly awards

Notes

References

External links
 League table and recent results at Soccerway
 Official website
 Liga I at uefa.com

2014-15
Rom
2014–15 in Romanian football